Syllitus elguetai is a species of beetle in the family Cerambycidae. It was described by Cerda in 1991.

References

Stenoderini
Beetles described in 1991